Dr. Helen Kathleen Mussallem  (7 January 1915 – 9 November 2012) was a noted, decorated Canadian nurse, who served in the Royal Canadian Army Medical Corps during World War II.

Life
Born in Prince Rupert, British Columbia to Solomon and Annie (née Besytt) Mussallem, both of Lebanese descent, Mussallem studied at the School of Nursing, Vancouver General Hospital from 1934 to 1937. Between 1943 and 1946, she served as a surgical nurse and lieutenant in the Royal Canadian Army Medical Corps during World War II. In 1947, she attended McGill University, where she received her bachelor's degree in Nursing. She received her Master's of Arts in Education from Columbia University Teachers College and was the first Canadian nurse to earn a doctoral degree from Columbia University. From 1963–81, she was Executive Director of the Canadian Nurses Association. From 1989–91 she was the President of the Victorian Order of Nurses.

Death
Mussallem died in Ottawa at the age of 97 on 9 November 2012.

Honours
 She was the first nurse outside the United Kingdom to be honoured as a Fellow of the Royal College of Nursing.
 She received the highest award that can be awarded by the International Red Cross, the Florence Nightingale Medal.
 In 1982, she was appointed Dame of Grace of the Venerable Order of Saint John.
 In 1969, she was made an Officer of the Order of Canada and was promoted to Companion in 1992.
 In 2006, she was appointed Capilano Herald Extraordinary within the Canadian Heraldic Authority. 
 She received honorary degrees from Memorial University, the University of New Brunswick, Queen's University, McMaster University, and the University of British Columbia.

References

External links
 Congratulations to Dr. Helen Mussallem!, VON website; retrieved 26 March 2014.
Mussallem Family history page, Maple Ridge Museum website; retrieved 26 March 2014.  
The Dr. Helen K. Mussallem Biography Project
Appointment as Dame of Grace of the Venerable Order of Saint John, london-gazette.co.uk, 22 April 1982; retrieved 26 March 2014.

1915 births
2012 deaths
Canadian Heraldic Authority
Canadian military nurses
Canadian officers of arms
Teachers College, Columbia University alumni
Companions of the Order of Canada
Dames of Grace of the Order of St John
McGill University alumni
People from Prince Rupert, British Columbia
Honorary Fellows of the Royal College of Nursing
Canadian people of Lebanese descent
World War II nurses
Female wartime nurses
Florence Nightingale Medal recipients
Canadian women nurses